The Fêtes de Genève (Geneva Festival) was an annual summer event in Geneva, Switzerland. It included a grand fireworks display.

History 

The Fêtes de Genève started during the first half of the twentieth century. Having suffered financial losses in 2016 and 2017, the festival was abandoned as of 2018. However, the grand fireworks still takes place; it was held on 11 August in 2018 and on 10 August in 2019.

Grand firework display 

Every year, on a Saturday evening of mid-August, the Geneva Festival presented a grand fireworks display (French: grand feu d'artifice pyromélodique) over Lake Geneva. The event was free although it had a budget of 500,000 to 700,000 Swiss francs. The fireworks involved about forty firing stations on the lake and about 30,000 rockets; they were about one-hour long and accompanied by music.

In 2013, according to the Radio télévision suisse, hundreds of thousands of people came to Geneva to see the grand fireworks display of the Fêtes de Genève. The Swiss Federal Railways organize special trains to bring the spectators home after the fireworks.

See also 
 Jardin anglais
 Geneva International Film Festival Tous Ecrans

Notes and references

External links 

 
 Official page of the grand fireworks

Music festivals in Switzerland
Fireworks events in Europe
Canton of Geneva
Tourist attractions in Geneva
Annual events in Switzerland
Summer events in Switzerland